Nenovsky is a surname. People with this surname include:

 Neno Kolev Nenovsky (1934–2004), Judge of the Constitutional Court of Bulgaria
 Nikolay Nenovsky (born 1963), Bulgarian economist

Bulgarian-language surnames